The Battle of Liegnitz on 15 August 1760 saw Frederick the Great's Prussian Army defeat the Austrian army under Ernst von Laudon during the Third Silesian War (part of the Seven Years' War).

The armies collided around the town of Liegnitz (now Legnica, Poland) in Lower Silesia. Laudon's Austrian cavalry attacked the Prussian position in the early morning but were beaten back by General Zieten's Hussars. An artillery duel emerged which was eventually won for the Prussians when a shell hit an Austrian powder wagon. The Austrian infantry then proceeded to attack the Prussian line, but was met with concentrated artillery fire. A Prussian infantry counter-attack led by the Regiment Anhalt-Bernburg on the left forced the Austrians into retreat. Notably, the Anhalt-Bernburgers charged Austrian cavalry with bayonets, a rare example of infantry assaulting cavalry.

Shortly after dawn the major action was over but Prussian artillery fire continued to harass the Austrians. General Leopold von Daun arrived and, learning of Laudon's defeat, decided not to attack despite his soldiers being fresh.

References

External links
 

Battles of the Seven Years' War
Battle of Liegnitz (1760)
Battles involving Austria
Battles involving Prussia
1760 in Austria
Battles of the Silesian Wars
Battles of Frederick the Great
History of Lower Silesian Voivodeship